The Clipper Mountain Wilderness is a  wilderness area in the Clipper Mountains of the eastern Mojave Desert and within Mojave Trails National Monument, located in northeastern San Bernardino County, California.  It is under the jurisdiction of the Bureau of Land Management.

Geography
The  Clipper Mountain Wilderness is found mostly on the northern section of the Clipper Mountains, which are adjacent on the north to Interstate 40 and historic U.S. Route 66. The wilderness area is adjoining the southern National Park Service Mojave National Preserve. It is 50 miles west of Needles, California.

Description
The Clipper Mountain Wilderness has rugged yellow and dark brown, horizontally striped mesas, narrow canyons with springs, and sparsely vegetated alluvial fans.  The small cluster of volcanic mountains is oriented northeast to southwest.  In the center, the most prominent ridge, Clipper Mountain, reaches an elevation of 4,625 feet before it dramatically drops off in series of sharp cliffs overlooking the Fenner and Clipper Valleys.  Castle Dome, a local landmark, can be clearly seen from Historic Route 66.

Natural history

Flora 
See: Category: Flora of the California desert regions
The plant community vegetation types here are predominantly Creosote bush (Larrea tridentata) xeric desert scrub and desert wash scrub habitats.  In the spring, the alluvial fans turn yellow with Brittlebush - Encelia farinosa and other desert wildflowers.

Fauna 
See: Category: Fauna of the Mojave Desert
Wildlife in the wilderness area is typical for the Mojave Desert; including a herd of 40-50 desert bighorn sheep, coyotes, black-tailed jackrabbits, Mohave ground squirrels, kangaroo rats, greater roadrunners, chukar, quail, prairie falcons, red-tailed hawks, golden eagles, rattlesnakes, and several species of lizards including the zebra-tailed lizard.  The entire wilderness is considered critical habitat for the threatened desert tortoise.

See also

 
 Mojave National Preserve

References

External links 
 
 
 

Wilderness areas of California
Mojave Trails National Monument
Protected areas of the Mojave Desert
Protected areas of San Bernardino County, California
Bureau of Land Management areas in California